Đuraš (also transliterated Djuras) is a Serbian masculine given name, a variant of Đurađ, in turn derived from Greek Georgios ("George"). It may refer to:

 Đuraš Ilijić ( 1326–62), Serbian nobleman
 Đuraš Vrančić ( 1300s), Serbian nobleman

See also
 Đurašević, surname
 Đurašić, surname

Further reading
 

Serbian masculine given names